This is a list of episodes for the third season (1977–78) of the NBC television series Quincy, M.E..

Jack Klugman ended this season two episodes early due to exhaustion.  NBC complied and dropped the additional two episodes so Klugman could rest up and return for the fourth season.

Episodes

References

External links
 

1977 American television seasons
1978 American television seasons